KWZ or kwz may refer to:

 KWZ, the DS100 code for Wuppertal Zoologischer Garten station, North Rhine-Westphalia, Germany
 KWZ, the IATA code for Kolwezi Airport, Democratic Republic of the Congo
 KWZ, the station code for Kalabagh railway station, Pakistan
 kwz, the ISO 639-3 code for Kwadi language, Angola